Prasophyllum candidum, commonly known as the Kiandra leek orchid, is a species of orchid endemic to eastern Australia. It has a single tubular, yellowish-green leaf and up to forty scented, bright white to greenish flowers. It grows in subalpine areas at altitudes above  in New South Wales and Victoria although in the latter state it is considered to be a form of P. odoratum.

Description
As with other leek orchids, the flowers are inverted so that the labellum is above the column rather than below it. The edges of the labellum are very ruffled and there is a yellowish-green, grooved callus in its centre. Flowering occurs from December to early February.

Taxonomy and naming
Prasophyllum candidum was first formally described in 1991 by Robert Bates and David Jones from a specimen collected between Tumut and Adaminaby and the description was published in Australian Orchid Research. The specific epithet (candidum) is a Latin word meaning "shining white" or "bright", referring to the colour of the flowers.

Distribution and habitat
This leek orchid grows in sub-alpine grassland above  in south-western New South Wales and Victoria. The Victorian Herbarium considers this species to be a form of P. odoratum.

References

External links 
 

candidum
Flora of New South Wales
Flora of Victoria (Australia)
Endemic orchids of Australia
Plants described in 1991